Sydney Jay Mead (July 18, 1933 – December 30, 2019) was an American industrial designer and neo-futurist concept artist, widely known for his designs for science-fiction films such as Blade Runner, Aliens and Tron. Mead has been described as "the artist who illustrates the future" and "one of the most influential concept artists and industrial designers of our time."

Life

Early life
Mead was born on July 18, 1933, in Saint Paul, Minnesota. His father was a Baptist minister, who read him pulp magazines, such as Buck Rogers and Flash Gordon, sparking his interest in science fiction. Mead was skilled in drawing at a young age. According to Mead, "by the time I was in high school I could draw the human figure, I could draw animals, and I had a sense of shading to show shape. I was really quite accomplished at that point with brush technique and so-forth." He described himself as being an "insular child." Mead graduated from high school in Colorado Springs, Colorado, in 1951. After serving a three-year enlistment in the U.S. Army, Mead attended the Art Center School in Los Angeles (now the Art Center College of Design, Pasadena), where he graduated in June 1959.

Career

In 1959, Mead was recruited to Ford Motor Company's Advanced Styling Studio by Elwood Engel. From 1960 to 1961, Mead worked in Ford Motor Company Styling in Detroit, Michigan. Mead left Ford after two years to illustrate books and catalogues for companies including United States Steel, Celanese, Allis-Chalmers and Atlas Cement. In 1970, he launched Syd Mead, Inc. in Detroit with clients including Philips Electronics.

With his own company in the 1970s, Mead spent about a third of his time in Europe, primarily to provide designs and illustrations for Philips, and he continued to work for international clients. Through the 1970s and 1980s, Mead and his company provided architectural renderings, both interior and exterior, for clients including Intercontinental Hotels, 3D International, Harwood Taylor & Associates, Don Ghia, Gresham & Smith and Philip Koether Architects.

Beginning in 1983, Mead developed working relationships with Sony, Minolta, Dentsu, Dyflex, Tiger Corporation, Seibu, Mitsukoshi, Bandai, NHK and Honda.

Mead's one-man shows began in 1973 with an exhibit at documenta 6 in Kassel, West Germany. His work was later exhibited in Japan, Italy, California and Spain. In 1983, Mead was invited by Chrysler Corporation to be a guest speaker to its design staff. He created a series of slides to provide visuals to the lecture, and the resulting presentation was a success. It was later expanded and enhanced with computer-generated images specifically created at the requests of several clients, including Disney, Carnegie Mellon University, Purdue University, Pratt Institute and the Society of Illustrators. In March 2010, Mead completed a four-city tour of Australia.

In 1993, a digital gallery consisting of 50 examples of his art with interface screens designed by him became one of the first CD-ROMs released in Japan. In 2004, Mead co-operated with Gnomon School of Visual Effects to produce a four-volume "how-to" DVD series titled Techniques of Syd Mead.

In 2018, Mead published his autobiography, titled A Future Remembered. Regarding his work, Mead said, "the idea supersedes technique," and that "I've called science fiction 'reality ahead of schedule.'"

In film

Mead worked with major studios on the feature films: Star Trek: The Motion Picture, Blade Runner, Tron, 2010, Short Circuit, Aliens, The Spirit of '76, Timecop, Johnny Mnemonic, Mission: Impossible III, Elysium, Tomorrowland and Blade Runner 2049. George Lucas created the AT-AT for his Star Wars saga based on art by Mead. Mead also contributed to the Japanese film Solar Crisis. In the 1990s, Mead supplied designs for two Japanese anime series, Turn A Gundam and the unfinished Yamato 2520.

In May 2007, he completed work on a documentary of his career with the director Joaquin Montalvan entitled Visual Futurist:The Art & Life of Syd Mead. The short 2008 documentary film 2019: A Future Imagined, also explored his works. Mead also appears in movie documentaries such as Dangerous Days: Making Blade Runner and Mark Kermode's On the Edge of Blade Runner, and promotional materials such as the DVD extra for Aliens and a promotional short film about the making of 2010.

Personal life
Mead was in a personal relationship with partner Roger Servick; the couple married in 2016. They established a publishing extension, OBLAGON, Inc., in Hollywood and relocated in 1998 to Pasadena, California, where Mead continued to work.

Death
On December 30, 2019, Mead died in his Pasadena home at age 86, after three years of lymphoma. Shortly after his death, tributes to Mead's life were posted on Twitter.

Gallery of works

See also
 Futurist

References

External links

 
 
 Syd Mead entry at Anime.com
 Blogs in JPN
 Detailed information for the "Syd Mead's Terraforming" video-game at the PC Engine Software Bible
 Entry for Syd Mead's Terraforming at PC-Engine Catalog Project
 Event Recap: "An Audience with Syd Mead", Brisbane, March 2010

 The Gnomon Workshop video tutorials with Syd Mead

Interviews
 Ed Naha, "Blade Runner's Syd Mead: An Artist With Designs on the Future", Starlog (USA)	May 1982, Iss. 58, pg. 36–39,+61
 Randy & Jean-Marc Lofficier, "Detective Future Past", Starlog (USA) November 1992, Iss. 184
 The future came true – An Interview with Syd Mead
 Syd Mead's interview at Jabučnjak, July 2009

1933 births
2019 deaths
Artists from Saint Paul, Minnesota
Artists from Colorado Springs, Colorado
Burials at Forest Lawn Memorial Park (Glendale)
Military personnel from Minnesota
Art Center College of Design alumni
American industrial designers
American production designers
Futurologists
Science fiction artists
Hard science fiction
Deaths from lymphoma
American gay artists
LGBT people from Minnesota
LGBT people from Colorado
American LGBT military personnel
20th-century American male artists
21st-century American male artists
United States Army soldiers
Inkpot Award winners